Alfons Amade (born 12 November 1999) is a German professional footballer who plays as a right-back for Belgian First Division A club Oostende.

Club career
Amade made his professional debut for 1899 Hoffenheim in the Bundesliga on 2 March 2019, coming on as a substitute in the 82nd minute for Nadiem Amiri in the match against Eintracht Frankfurt, which finished as a 2–3 away loss.

International career
Born in Germany, Amade is of Mozambican descent. He is a youth international for Germany.

References

External links
 
 
 
 

1999 births
Living people
German people of Mozambican descent
Sportspeople from Heidelberg
Footballers from Baden-Württemberg
German footballers
Association football fullbacks
Germany youth international footballers
Bundesliga players
3. Liga players
Regionalliga players
Belgian Pro League players
TSG 1899 Hoffenheim players
TSG 1899 Hoffenheim II players
Eintracht Braunschweig players
K.V. Oostende players
German expatriate footballers
German expatriate sportspeople in Belgium
Expatriate footballers in Belgium